Glen Young may refer to:
 Glen Young (wide receiver) (born 1960), American football wide receiver
 Glen Young (gridiron football) (born 1969), Canadian gridiron football coach and former linebacker
 Glen Young (rugby union) (born 1994), Scottish rugby union player

See also
 Glenn Young (1929–2013), American football defensive back